The 2017 Tour de France is the 104th edition of the cycle race, one of cycling's Grand Tours.  The race started in Düsseldorf, Germany on 1 July, with stage 11 occurring on 12 July with a stage finish in Pau. The race finished on the Champs-Élysées in Paris on 23 July.

Classification standings

Stage 1 
1 July 2017 — Düsseldorf to Düsseldorf, individual time trial (ITT)

The tour began on 1 July 2017 in Germany, with an individual time trial that started and finished in Düsseldorf. After the intermediate time check at the Königsallee, the route headed back towards the Messe Düsseldorf.

The time trial was held in wet conditions, which saw numerous riders crash. Alejandro Valverde and Ion Izagirre suffered the most serious of these crashes, with both riders forced to abandon the Tour.

Stage 2 
2 July 2017 — Düsseldorf to Liège, 

This flat stage departed from Düsseldorf and quickly headed over the category 4 climb of the Côte de Grafenberg. The race then looped east through Mettmann and Ratingen and headed back west, through the outskirts of Düsseldorf, to the first intermediate sprint at Mönchengladbach. The peloton then travelled south through Jülich and continued southwest through Aachen, before crossing the border into Belgium. The race continued through Kelmis and Herve to the category 4 climb of the Côte d'Olne, and the riders then headed west through Chaudfontaine, before the stage finish in Liege.

Stage 3 
3 July 2017 — Verviers to Longwy, 

This undulating stage departed south from Verviers in Belgium, and headed over the category 4 Côte de Sart in the first . The route then used part of the Circuit de Spa-Francorchamps before heading through Stavelot, Trois-Ponts and Vielsalm. The riders then crossed into Luxembourg and travelled through Troisvierges. An intermediate sprint took place at Wincrange, and the race then continued over the category 4 Côte de Wiltz and the category 3 Côte d'Eschdorf. After descending through Grosbous, the race passed through Saeul, Kehlen, Dippach and Esch-sur-Alzette, before crossing into France at Audun-le-Tiche. The route then turned west through Villerupt, headed over the category 4 climb of the Côte de Villers-la-Montagne and turned north at Chenières. The race then had an uphill finish on the  climb of the category 3 Côte des Religieuses in Longwy.

Stage 4 
4 July 2017 — Mondorf-les-Bains to Vittel, 

This flat stage departed east from Mondorf-les-Bains in Luxembourg and crossed the border, heading south, from Schengen to Contz-les-Bains. The riders then headed south-west to Thionville, turned south for Maizières-lès-Metz and then west for Saint-Privat-la-Montagne. The race continued south through Ars-sur-Moselle, Pont-à-Mousson, Dieulouard and Toul. An intermediate sprint took place at Goviller, before the category 4 climb of the Col des Trois Fontaines. The race continued through Gironcourt-sur-Vraine to the finish line in Vittel.

Peter Sagan, who finished second to 's Arnaud Démare, was initially demoted to 115th after contact with Mark Cavendish during the sprint, which resulted in Cavendish, Ben Swift and John Degenkolb hitting the ground. Sagan was also penalised 30 seconds in the general classification – dropping him out of the top-ten overall – and 80 points in the points classification: a 50-point penalty plus the 30 he had initially gained for second place on the stage. Later at a press conference, Sagan was disqualified from the race.

Stage 5 
5 July 2017 — Vittel to La Planche des Belles Filles, 

This low mountain stage departed from Vittel and headed east, with racing beginning at Valleroy-le-Sec, where the peloton turned south. The riders then travelled through Darney and again turned east at Demangevelle, heading to Saint-Loup-sur-Semouse. The peloton then turned south to Ormoiche and then north-east to Luxeuil-les-Bains, continuing north to Fougerolles.

Following the previous day's accident, Cavendish was diagnosed with a right scapular fracture and did not start the stage.

Stage 6 
6 July 2017 — Vesoul to Troyes, 

This flat stage departed west from Vesoul, with the race starting after passing through Vaivre-et-Montoille. The peloton continued through Fayl-Billot for the category 4 climb of the Côte de Langres. The riders then went north-west towards Chaumont, which was followed by an intermediate sprint at Colombey-les-Deux-Églises. After continuing west through Bar-sur-Aube, the peloton then climbed the category 4 Côte de la colline Sainte-Germaine. The route then passed through Vendeuvre-sur-Barse and Rouilly-Sacey, before crossing the Seine at Pont-Sainte-Marie and heading to the finish line in Troyes.

Stage 7 
7 July 2017 — Troyes to Nuits-Saint-Georges, 

This flat stage departed south-east from Troyes, with the race starting outside the city centre. The peloton continued through Verrières, and went in a southerly direction through Bar-sur-Seine and Châtillon-sur-Seine, to an intermediate sprint at Chanceaux. After passing through Saint-Martin-du-Mont and Mâlain, the riders then climbed the category 4 Côte d'Urcy. The race then took a circuitous clockwise route through Gevrey-Chambertin, Gilly-lès-Cîteaux, Villebichot, Auvillars-sur-Saône and Corgoloin, to the finish line in Nuits-Saint-Georges.

A difference of only 0.0003 seconds was judged by photo finish to separate the winner Marcel Kittel from Edvald Boasson Hagen, second.

Stage 8 
8 July 2017 — Dole to Station des Rousses, 

This hilly stage departed from Dole, heading south-east through Arbois, to an intermediate sprint at Montrond.

Stage 9 
9 July 2017 — Nantua to Chambéry, 

This mountain stage departed east from Nantua, with the race starting at Les Neyrolles. The category 2 climb of Côte des Neyrolles and the category 3 Col de Bérentin at  occurred in the early part of the stage. Turning south at Anglefort, the riders continued through Culoz, to an intermediate sprint at Massignieu-de-Rives. The final descent of the stage was to Le Bourget-du-Lac, before the finish line in Chambéry.

Both Geraint Thomas and Richie Porte were forced to withdraw with bone fractures, after suffering crashes on the descents of the Col de la Biche and the Mont du Chat, respectively. Other withdrawals included Robert Gesink, Manuele Mori and Jesús Herrada.

Rest day 1 
10 July 2017 — Dordogne

After suffering injuries in a crash on the previous stage, Rafał Majka decided to withdraw from the race on the first rest day.

Stage 10 
11 July 2017 — Périgueux to Bergerac, 

This flat stage departed south-east from Périgueux, with the race starting before reaching Saint-Laurent-sur-Manoire. The peloton continued east through Saint-Crépin-d'Auberoche and Fossemagne to Thenon. After heading south-east through Auriac-du-Périgord and then turning south-west at Montignac, the riders turned east at Les Eyzies-de-Tayac-Sireuil and headed south from Sarlat-la-Canéda to the category 4 climb of the Côte de Domme. The race then continued west to an intermediate sprint at Saint-Cyprien, and then passed through Siorac-en-Périgord and Le Buisson-de-Cadouin, before reaching the category 4 climb of the Côte du Buisson-de-Cadouin. The riders continued through Lalinde and Creysse, before going around the south side of Bergerac and reaching the finish line from the western side of the city.

Stage 11 
12 July 2017 — Eymet to Pau, 

This flat stage departed south-west from Eymet, heading through Seyches and Marmande. The peloton continued through Casteljaloux and Houeillès to Labastide-d'Armagnac, and then turned south-east for Monclar where the riders continued south-west. An intermediate sprint took place at Aire-sur-l'Adour, prior to the riders going over the category 4 climb of the Côte d’Aire-sur-l'Adour. The riders turned south for Garlin and continued to Saint-Laurent-Bretagne. The race then turned south-west for Morlaàs and headed to the finish line in Pau.

References

Sources

External links 

2017 Tour de France
Tour de France stages